Rogovë is one of the largest villages in the District of Gjakova, Kosovo. It is located alongside the White Drin river.

Notes and references

Notes

References

Villages in Gjakova